Blanquette de veau is a French veal stew. In the classic version of the dish the meat is simmered in a white stock and served in a sauce velouté enriched with cream and egg. It is among the most popular meat dishes in France.

Definition
The Oxford Companion to Food describes "blanquette" as "a French and to some extent international culinary term indicating a dish of white meat (veal, poultry, also lamb) served in a white sauce". In Larousse Gastronomique, Prosper Montagne's definition is "the French term for a ragout of white meat (veal, lamb or poultry) cooked in a white stock or water with aromatic flavourings".

Simone Beck, Louisette Bertholle and Julia Child in their Mastering the Art of French Cooking describe blanquette de veau, as "a much-loved stew in France … veal simmered in a lightly seasoned white stock … served in a sauce velouté made from the veal cooking stock and enriched with cream and egg yolks". In 2007 Anne Willan wrote that French television had recently conducted a poll of favourite meat dishes in which "Blanquette de veau was in the top five, with steak frites and gigot d'agneau".

Ingredients
The name "blanquette" derives from "blanc", the French for white, and there is a purist view that the whiteness of the dish is key, and coloured vegetables such as carrots should not be included. In the words of Anthony Bourdain:

Some cooks, such as Anne Willan, share Bourdain's view, but numerous cooks from Auguste Escoffier (1907) onwards have included carrots in their recipes for blanquette de veau.

Beck, Bertholle and Child list six suitable cuts of veal for a blanquette: poitrine (breast), haute de côtes (short ribs), épaule (shoulder), côtes découvertes (middle neck) and gîte/jarret (knuckle). Other cooks and food writers have differed in their recommended cuts for the dish:

In older recipes the veal was roast and allowed to go cold before being sliced or chopped, covered in a white sauce and reheated. Eliza Acton's 1858 recipe includes mushrooms gently sautéed in butter and served over the veal with Sauce Tournée (also called velouté). There was at one time some question of how blanquettes were to be distinguished from fricassées. In 1960 The Times commented:

According to Montagne, blanquette de veau is usually served with rice à la créole but may also be served with celeriac, halved celery hearts, carrots, braised parsnips or leeks, braised cucumber, braised lettuce or lettuce hearts. Pasta or potatoes are sometimes served instead of rice, and Escoffier recommends noodles.

Notes, references and sources

Notes

References

Sources

See also
 Cuisine of France
 List of stews
 List of veal dishes
 

French stews
Veal dishes